Funter Bay is a two-mile-long (3 km) bay on the western side of Admiralty Island near its northern tip, in the Alexander Archipelago of the U.S. state of Alaska. It lies within the Hoonah-Angoon Census Area, in the Unorganized Borough of Alaska.

Funter Bay was the site of a World War II internment camp for Aleuts  relocated 1500 miles from their homes. It was "the site of an abandoned cannery in which the St. Paul evacuees were housed. The St. George camp was across the bay at an old mine site.". The injustices they suffered were the subject of the US Congress' Aleut Restitution Act of 1988.

Demographics

Funter Bay appeared on the 1890 U.S. Census as an unincorporated area with 25 residents (described as a mining camp, though a cannery was also located here). Of its residents, 20 were Native Americans (9 males and 11 females) and 5 were White (all male). 15 residents were considered "native", while 10 were considered "foreign." There were 8 houses and 11 families. It has not appeared on the census since.

Notes

External links
 A Century of Servitude
 'Aleut Story' film site 

Bays of Alaska
Bays of Hoonah–Angoon Census Area, Alaska